Seyyit Ahmet Ağralı (born 1940) is a Turkish wrestler. He competed in the 1968 Summer Olympics.

References

External links
 

1940 births
Living people
Wrestlers at the 1968 Summer Olympics
Turkish male sport wrestlers
Olympic wrestlers of Turkey
People from Kavak, Samsun